Rutherford College may refer to:

 Rutherford College, North Carolina, Burke County, North Carolina, United States
 Rutherford College of Technology, predecessor of Northumbria University, Newcastle upon Tyne, United Kingdom
 Rutherford College, Auckland, New Zealand
 Rutherford College, Kent, University of Kent, United Kingdom
 Rutherford College (North Carolina), former Christian college

See also
Rutherford (disambiguation)
Rutherford High School (disambiguation)
Rutherford School (disambiguation)